Hans Freiherr Geyr von Schweppenburg (October 3, 1884 – August 24, 1963) was a German arborist and ornithologist. He was born in Müddersheim and studied in Bonn and Berlin, gaining a doctoral thesis in forest science. He became a professor at Münden Forestry University, where he stayed until his retirement in 1938.

Geyr von Schweppenburg published a number of important papers on forestry, but his passion was studying birds. By age 20 he had already published 15 scientific papers on bird, and the total rose to 250 between the first in 1901 and the last in 1963. He was particularly interested in bird migration, and for many years his studies of the red-breasted flycatcher (1911) and Eurasian siskin (1930) were the major works on those species. He co-authored a thesis on the bird life of the Rhine valley, and studied owl pellets. By 1906 had already identified some 20,000 vertebrate remains in such pellets.

Between 1907-1908 he participated in expeditions to Spitzbergen and Bear Island, and in 1913 he went to Sudan .In 1914 he undertook a  3,000–km journey through southern Algeria collecting 217 bird samples. Shortly after, he lost both legs in the First Battle of the Marne, but learned to walk with artificial legs, and continued to work.

Geyr von Schweppenburg named some subspecies of birds, including the pale crag martin subspecies Ptyonoprogne obsoleta spatzi.

In 1933 he signed the Vow of allegiance of the Professors of the German Universities and High-Schools to Adolf Hitler and the National Socialistic State.

References

External links
Original obituary in German

German ornithologists
1884 births
1963 deaths
20th-century German zoologists